A referendum on the islands' status was held in the Northern Mariana Islands  on 9 November 1969. For the fourth time since 1958 a majority of voters supported integration with Guam. However, a referendum held in Guam on 4 November on integration with the Northern Mariana Islands had been rejected by 58% of Guamanian voters.

Background
Previous referendums on either integration with Guam or the islands' status had been held in 1958, 1961 and 1963. On each occasion a majority had been in favor of integration. However, the proposal remained unfulfilled.

The 1969 referendum was organized by the local Parliament, and was held prior to a visit by a United Nations commission in early 1970.

Results
Voters were given five options:
Do you want to become U.S. Citizen within the political framework of the Territory of Guam?
Do you want independence?
Do you want to become an unincorporated Territory of the United States?
Do want to free associate with the United States?
What other form of government do you want?

References

Northern Mariana
1969 in the Northern Mariana Islands
1969
1969
Northern Marianas